Camilla Belle Routh (born October 2, 1986), known professionally as Camilla Belle, is an American actress, director, and producer.

Early life
An only child, Belle was born to Deborah Cristina Gould and Jack Wesley Routh, a country music performer and composer. She attended Marlborough School, an all-girl high school in Los Angeles. She grew up speaking English and Portuguese. During her childhood, she frequently visited her mother's family in Brazil.She was raised in her mother's devout Roman Catholic faith.

Career
Early in her career, Belle appeared in numerous television commercials for well-known brands, including Eli Lilly Pharmaceutical, Cabbage Patch Kids, Campbell's Soup and Public Broadcasting System. In 1992, she was cast as a lead in her first film, NBC's thriller, Trapped Beneath the Earth. Belle began her career with a small role in the film version of the novel A Little Princess (1995). In The Lost World: Jurassic Park (1997), she played Cathy Bowman, a young wealthy British girl attacked by a pack of Compsognathus. In 1998, she played Aubrey Shepard on the Focus on the Family radio drama Adventures in Odyssey. Following a turn as Steven Seagal's daughter in The Patriot (1998), she earned a 1999 Youth in Film Young Artist Award nomination for her portrayal of Sandra Bullock's character as a girl in Practical Magic (1998), as well as another nomination the same year for her guest appearance on the TV series Walker: Texas Ranger.

She received her third and fourth Young Artist Award nominations respectively for the television film Replacing Dad (1999) and for her first lead role, in the Disney Channel television film Rip Girls (2000). Belle played the lead role in the television film Back to the Secret Garden (2001), then took a break from acting before returning with a role in the independent film The Quiet (2005).  SFStation wrote that "performance-wise The Quiet belongs to Camilla Belle and Elisha Cuthbert". In 2006, she signed a multi-year contract to become  the face of Vera Wang's "Princess" fragrance, appearing in print advertisements and television commercials. Her contract ended in July 2009.

She returned to performing after a short break with the lead role of sixteen-year-old Jill Johnson in the remake of When a Stranger Calls (2006). In 2007, she appeared in coffee brand Nespresso's television commercial alongside actor George Clooney. She then played a lead role in the Roland Emmerich-directed big-budget film 10,000 BC (2008), which grossed $269 million at the worldwide box office. In 2012, Belle sang in an advertisement for Cotton. Belle played Isabel Wallace in The Mad Whale (2017), a student project produced by James Franco's Elysium Bandini Studios and the USC School of Cinematic Arts. She starred as Carina in Fox's streaming platform Tubi's original romantic comedy film 10 Truths About Love (2022), which anchored the platform's Valentine’s Day programming event.

Public image 
Belle's appearance and fashion choices have been a subject of media attention. She has appeared on the cover of numerous fashion magazines, including Teen Vogue, Elle, Harper's Bazaar, Tatler, Ocean Drive, Glamour, Nylon, Vanidades, Lucky, ES Magazine and Genlux. She is a frequent guest star at New York Fashion Week, among other fashion events. She has also been a runway model for Alberta Ferretti and The Heart Truth's Red Dress Collection.

Her style has received noteworthy praise from periodicals such as Cosmopolitan, InStyle and People. In 2007, People magazine named her "Fashionista of the Week" during Mercedes-Benz Fall Fashion Week in New York City. People wrote that Belle "managed to look appropriate and fashion-forward at every event she went to this week, including Max Azria, Oscar de la Renta and Miss Sixty." Belle has never worked with a professional stylist and credits her mother as her stylist instead. In her fashion choices, Belle and her mother are inspired by Elizabeth Taylor and Old Hollywood.

Personal life
Belle dated Joe Jonas from late 2008 to mid-2009. They met when she appeared in the Jonas Brothers' "Lovebug" music video. Taylor Swift wrote the song "Better than Revenge" about their relationship, after Jonas left her for Belle.

Filmography

Film

Television

Music videos

Other credits

Awards and nominations

References

External links 

 
 Camilla Belle on Instagram

Living people
Actresses from Los Angeles
American people of Brazilian descent
American people of Portuguese descent
American people of Italian descent
American people of English descent
American people of German descent
American people of French descent
American child actresses
American film actresses
American radio actresses
American television actresses
Actresses of Brazilian descent
20th-century American actresses
21st-century American actresses
Hispanic and Latino American actresses
Brazilian American
Brazilian actors
1986 births